The Walther G22 is a semi-automatic rifle chambered in the popular .22 Long Rifle (5.6 mm) cartridge, made by Walther. It is of bullpup design and constructed of polymer and steel.

The rifle can be configured for both left and right hand shooters. The stock is designed so that the ejection port and cocking handle can be relocated to the other side for left-handed shooters. A spare magazine, held by friction, is stored inside the polymer stock behind the magazine well. It was produced in matte black or green.

Spacers allow the butt of the stock to be adjusted to the user's preference.

Three Weaver rail mounts are present on the G22: The top handle scope mount (which also has an integrated movable six-setting rear sight,) a small mount just below the muzzle intended for a Walther-produced laser sight, and a longer mount under the forearm for bipods, flashlights, etc.

References

.22 LR semi-automatic rifles
Bullpup rifles